Camp Cordero Water Aerodrome  is located adjacent to Camp Cordero, at the north end of Cordero Channel, British Columbia, Canada.

References

External links
Cordero Lodge website

Seaplane bases in British Columbia
Strathcona Regional District
Registered aerodromes in British Columbia